Świerkosz is a Polish-language surname, derived from the word  ("spruce"). It may refer to:

 Alfred Świerkosz (1900–1968), Polish writer
 Barbara Grzybowska-Świerkosz (born 1937), Polish chemist
 Jan Świerkosz (born 1922), Polish communist politician
 Krzysztof Świerkosz (born 1966), Polish poet